Tomichia natalensis is a species of very small freshwater snails which have a gill and an operculum, gastropod mollusks or micromollusks in the family Tomichiidae. 

This species is endemic to South Africa.

References

Endemic fauna of South Africa
Truncatelloidea
Taxonomy articles created by Polbot